Brabenec is a Czech surname. Notable people with the surname include:

 Jaromír E. Brabenec (born 1934), Czech graphic designer and sculptor
 Vratislav Brabenec (born 1943), Czech poet and musician
 Kamil Brabenec (basketball) (born 1951), Czech basketball player
 Josef Brabenec (born 1957), Canadian tennis player
 Kamil Brabenec (born 1976), Czech ice hockey player
 Karl A. Brabenec (born 1979), American politician

Czech-language surnames